Niger competed at the 2004 Summer Paralympics in Athens, Greece. The team included 1 athlete, but won no medals.

Sports

Athletics

Men's track

See also
Niger at the Paralympics
Niger at the 2004 Summer Olympics

References 

Nations at the 2004 Summer Paralympics
2004
Summer Paralympics